The Mamquam River is a c.35 km (c. 21 mi) tributary of the Squamish River.

Course 

The Mamquam River originates at Mamquam Pass and starts off by flowing northwest for about 7.5 km.  Shortly below its source, the river picks up the waters of the stream draining November Lake.  The river, after about 7.5 km, turns north and continues in that direction for about 6.9 km to its confluence with its second named tributary, Martin Creek.  At the mouth of Martin Creek, the river turns southwest for about 5.4 km to the mouth of Skookum Creek.  At the mouth of Skookum Creek, the river turns west and flows that way for about 12 km all the way to its confluence with the Squamish River in Squamish.  Its other main tributaries, Ring and Mashiter Creeks, enter near the river's mouth.

Tributaries 

The Mamquam River has three main tributaries.  They are:

1. Skookum Creek: Skookum Creek flows southwest from remote Mamquam Lake within Garibaldi Provincial Park and enters the Mamquam about 12 km above its mouth.  It is said to have several large, high volume waterfalls near its confluence with the Mamquam.

2. Ring Creek: Beginning at the head of the Diamond Glacier within Garibaldi Park, Ring Creek flows south then west to its confluence with the Mamquam about 4.2 km above its mouth.  The creek is very swift, cold, silty and fast flowing.  

3. Mashiter Creek: Flowing west then east from its source on Columnar Peak, Mashiter Creek is the Mamquams final tributary, entering the Mamquam about 2.7 km above its mouth near Garibaldi Estates.  It is popular with kayakers, as it has several rapids and waterfalls along its course.

See also
List of British Columbia rivers
Mamquam Mountain
Mamquam Icefield

References 

Rivers of the Pacific Ranges
Garibaldi Ranges
Sea-to-Sky Corridor
New Westminster Land District